The 2023 Houston mayoral election will be held on November 7, 2023 to elect the mayor of Houston, Texas. Incumbent mayor Sylvester Turner is term-limited and cannot seek re-election to a third term in office.

Candidates

Declared
Chris Hollins, member of the Houston Metro Board of Directors, former acting Harris County Clerk, and former vice chair of the Texas Democratic Party (Party affiliation: Democratic)
Amanda Edwards, former at-large city councilor and candidate for U.S. Senate in 2020 (Party affiliation: Democratic)
Robert Gallegos, city councilor
Gilbert Garcia, bond investor and former chair of the Houston Metro Board of Directors
Ralph Garcia
Naoufal Houjami, entertainment consultant and candidate for mayor in 2019
Lee Kaplan, attorney (Party affiliation: Democratic)
Rickey Tezino, community activist
John Whitmire, state senator and brother-in-law of former mayor Kathy Whitmire (Party affiliation: Democratic)
Robin Williams, police officer and U.S. Marine Corps veteran (Party affiliation: Democratic)

Potential

Endorsements

Fundraising 
Some candidates have not filed financial disclosures. Those who have are listed below:

References

External links 
Official campaign websites
 Amanda Edwards (D) for Mayor
 Chris Hollins (D) for Mayor
 Naoufal Houjami for Mayor
 Lee Kaplan (D) for Mayor
 Rickey Tezino for Mayor
 John Whitmire (D) for Mayor
 Robin Williams (D) for Mayor

2023 in Houston
2023 Texas elections
Houston
Mayoral elections in Houston
Non-partisan elections